George Guttormsen was a college football player. Guttormsen was a prominent quarterback for the Washington Huskies. He was a letterman at Washington from 1924 to 1926 and captain of the 1926 team. In the 1926 Rose Bowl, Wildcat Wilson threw a touchdown pass to Guttormsen. Guttormsen was an assistant coach at Washington in 1929.

References

American football quarterbacks
Washington Huskies football players
Washington Huskies football coaches